is a professional Japanese baseball player. He plays outfielder for the Tokyo Yakult Swallows.

References 

2000 births
Living people
Baseball people from Fukuoka Prefecture
Japanese baseball players
Nippon Professional Baseball outfielders
Tokyo Yakult Swallows players